is a fictional character in Nintendo and Game Freak's Pokémon franchise, introduced in the 2016 video games Pokémon Sun and Moon, being a central character in the story, and has appeared in numerous Pokémon media.

Concept and creation
In the Japanese version, Lillie uses 'watakushi', a personal pronoun which, when used outside of formal situations, makes a character seem either "prim and proper", "cultured", or "snobby".

Appearances

In the video games
Lillie first appears in Pokémon Sun and Moon. At the start of the game, she escapes from the Aether Paradise, a conservation area owned by the Aether Foundation, with the Legendary Pokemon Cosmog, whom she nicknames Nebby. Professor Kukui takes her on as his assistant after this, providing shelter for both her and Nebby. At the start of the game, Nebby wanders off and ends up being attacked by a group of Spearow. After the player character rescues it, she ends up helping the player on their Island Challenge around the Alola region, whilst researching into Nebby's origins. Whilst visiting the Aether House on Ula'Ula Island, the third island of the region, she is attacked by Team Skull Admin Plumeria whilst their leader, Guzma was distracting the player, allowing them to capture Nebby and bring it back to the Aether Paradise. The player, their rivals Hau and Gladion, and Lille, break into the Paradise to rescue Nebby, confronting the head of the organization, Lusamine, who is revealed to the player to be her and Gladion's mother. After Nebby evolves into Cosmoem and Lusamine disappears through an Ultra Wormhole, a portal to the Ultra Space, an interdimensional spacial realm that links to numerous dimensions, that she forced Nebby to create, Lillie and the player head to the Altar on Poni Island, where using the mysterious items, the Sun Flute and the Moon Flute, they are able to get Nebby to evolve into either Solgaleo or Lunala, depending on the game version. They follow Lusamine into Ultra Space and rescue her. She departs for the Kanto region alongside her mother at the end of the game. She later appears in Pokémon Ultra Sun and Ultra Moon, where she has a more prominent role and acts more as an assistant character than in Sun and Moon. In these games, she does not depart for Kanto, and instead becomes a trainer in Alola, assisting the player in stopping Team Rainbow Rocket in the postgame. She also appears in Pokémon Masters, forming several sync pairs, with her main pairing of Lillie and Clefairy, alongside alternate pairings with the Pokemon Ribombee, Lunala, Polteageist, and Comfey.

In the anime
Lillie appears in the Pokemon anime, as a companion of Ash Ketchum and a student of the Pokemon School. Lillie first appeared in Pokémon the Series: Sun & Moons episode "Alola to New Adventure!" as well as many subsequent episodes in the series.  In the anime, she has a fear of Pokemon, but slowly grows to become used to them. She partners with an Alolan Vulpix nicknamed Snowy, which hatched from a Pokemon egg, as her main Pokemon companion. She also appears in the second episode of Pokémon Evolutions, which recounts the events that took place at the Altar on Poni Island as they are depicted in the Ultra games.

In the manga
Lillie appeared in the Sun, Moon, Ultra Sun & Ultra Moon chapter of Pokémon Adventures.

Reception
Since her appearance in Pokémon Sun and Moon, Lillie has received mostly positive reception. She is a popular character for fans of Sun and Moon. The company Good Smile has produced multiple figurines of Lillie. A Nendoroid figurine was released in November 2017 depicting Lillie and the Pokémon Cosmog. She received another Nendoroid figurine as well as a Figma figurine, both of which were revealed at Wonder Festival 2018. People who pre-order the Figma figurine from either Good Smile or Pokémon Center Online got a hand dryer or hair brush respectively. Lillie has also appeared multiple times in the Pokémon Trading Card Game in its Sun and Moon expansion sets. 

Chris Carter of Destructoid regarded her as one of the best aspects of Sun and Moon. Alex Donaldson of VG247 found Lillie "endearing", citing the "snappy" English localization for this. While Nick Wanserski did not think her decision to give up her "pacifist" ways to be justified, he nevertheless found the resolution with her mother to be well executed. Allegra Frank and Simone de Rochefort of Polygon regarded Lillie as one of the best women in video games in 2016. They note the emphasis the games put on her story, and how she works to overcome her limitations and comes out of her tribulations stronger. Frank also praised Ultra Sun and Ultra Moon for expanding on her story even further. She gave her praise for her appearance in the 999th and 1000th episodes of the Pokémon anime, praising how it handles her fear of Pokémon and calling her "sympathetic." Daniel Dockery of SyFy Wire similarly praised this growth, noting it as feeling more "real" than other comparable growth scenarios in the anime.

Dan Van Winkle of The Mary Sue expressed hope that a followup to the Sun and Moon games would star Lillie in the setting of Pokémon Red and Blue. Fellow contributor to The Mary Sue Paige Lyman regarded Lillie as the highlight of the game due to her character arc and the friendship that developed between the player character and Lillie. Meanwhile, Emily Reuben of Ball State Daily criticized Sun and Moon for devoting too much time to Lillie and taking away from the player character's story. She further criticized Ultra Sun and Ultra Moon'' for expanding her significance.

References

Female characters in anime and manga
Female characters in video games
Role-playing video game characters
Nintendo protagonists
Pokémon characters
Teenage characters in video games
Video game characters introduced in 2016
Television characters introduced in 2016
Fictional socialites
Fictional pacifists
Fictional biologists
Video game memes
Internet memes introduced in 2016